Cecily O'Bryen (7 September 1899 – 17 March 1984) was a British diver. She competed in the women's 3 metre springboard event at the 1924 Summer Olympics.

References

External links
 

1899 births
1984 deaths
British female divers
Olympic divers of Great Britain
Divers at the 1924 Summer Olympics
Place of birth missing